Omnipresent is the second studio album by Hate Dept., released on February 20, 1996 by Neurotic Records.

Reception

Aiding & Abetting said "perhaps the band's most important attribute is its ability to combine the catchy with the intense without creating wanky anthems" praised them for being "capable of shifting moods as well as anyone in the game." Sonic Boom lauded the band for continuing in the style of Mainline E.P. while saying "there are still plenty of tracks that deliver their classic sounds of anger and spite and still tremendous amounts of energy in their songs." CMJ listed Omnipresent as one of the magazine's top choices for the month of May.

Track listing

Accolades

Personnel
Adapted from the Omnipresent liner notes.

Hate Dept.
 Coby Bassett – guitar, backing vocals
 Ryan Daily – synthesizer, drums, backing vocals
 Charles Hunt – drums, backing vocals
 Steven Seibold – lead vocals, programming, production

Additional performers
 Dianna O'Donahue – vocals and arrangements
 Shawn Sutherland – percussion, backing vocals

Production and design
 David Braucher – art direction
 Alberto Lopez – executive-producer
 Jenessa Nye – photography
 Rob Robinson – cover art
 Bill Walker – executive-producer

Release history

References

External links 
 
 Omnipresent at Discogs (list of releases)

1996 albums
Hate Dept. albums